A browser game or a "flash game" is a video game that is played via the internet using a web browser. They are mostly free-to-play and can be single-player or multiplayer.

Some browser games are also available as mobile apps, PC games, or on consoles. For users, the advantage of the browser version is not having to install the game; the browser automatically downloads the necessary content from the game's website. However, the browser version may have fewer features or inferior graphics compared to the others, which are usually native apps.

The front end of a browser game is what runs in the user's browser. It is implemented with the standard web technologies of HTML, CSS, JavaScript, and WebAssembly. In addition, WebGL enables more sophisticated graphics. On the back end, numerous server technologies can be used.

In the past, many games were created with Adobe Flash, but they can no longer be played in the major browsers, such as Google Chrome, Safari, and Firefox due to Adobe Flash being shut down on December 31, 2020. Thousands of these games have been preserved by the Flashpoint project.

History 
When the Internet first became widely available and initial web browsers with basic HTML support were released, the earliest browser games were similar to text-based Multi-User Dungeons (MUDs), minimizing interactions to what implemented through simple browser controls but supporting online interactions with other players through a basic client–server model. One of the first known examples of a browser game was Earth 2025, first released in 1995. It featured only text but allowed players to interact and form alliances with other players of the game.

Browser technology quickly began to mature in the mid-1990s with support for browser plug-ins and the introduction of JavaScript. More advanced browser interactions, unbounded by the restrictions of HTML and that used client-side processing were possible. Among other browser extensions, these new plug-ins allowed uses to run applets made in the Java language and interactive animations created in Macromedia Flash. These technologies were initially intended to provide web page developers tools to create fully immersive, interactive websites, though this use fell out of favor as it was considered elitism and broke expected browsing behavior. Instead, these technologies found use by programmers to create small browser games among other unexpected uses such as general animation tools.

Sites began to emerge in the late 1990s to collect these browser games and other works, such as Sun Microsystems' HotJava. These sites started to become a popular commodity as they drew web visitors. Microsoft acquired one such site, The Village, in 1996, and rebranded it as the Internet Gaming Zone, offering various card and board browser games. ClassicGames.com was created in 1997 to host a selection of classic, Java-based online multiplayer games such as chess and checkers; its popularity led Yahoo! to purchase the site in 1998 and rebranding it as Yahoo! Games. 

In 1999, Tom Fulp kickstarted the Flash games scene with the release of the game Pico's School on his site Newgrounds that featured a "complexity of design and polish in presentation that was virtually unseen in amateur Flash game development" of the time.

Expansion of broadband connectivity in the early 2000s drew more people to play browser games through these sites, as well as added attention as viral phenomenon. New sites like Kongregate and Armor Games arose for hosting Flash-based games while also offering their own titles, while companies like PopCap Games and King launched their own portals featuring titles they had developed. Social media sites also drove more players to browser games. Facebook, after launching in 2004, added support for browser game functionality that integrated with its social network features, creating social network games, notably with Zynga's Farmville. The success of browser games did hurt some developers. Humongous Entertainment reported that they lost players to Flash games in the early 2000s. 

Flash games were considered to have hit their peak in the mid-2000s but waned by the early 2010s. Their popularity had fallen due to two primary causes. First was the introduction of mobile gaming, primarily with Apple's iPhone release in 2007 and the availability of the App Store. Through the App Store, anyone could release apps for the iPhone, and with the addition of in-app purchases, new revenue models such as free-to-play quickly emerged for mobile games, well surpassing the current ad-driven revenue model of browser games. Google used the same concepts for developing the Android storefront Play Store. Developers either augmented browser games or shifted to the mobile platform to take advantage of the new revenue opportunities; notably, King transitioned one of its browser games into one of the most successful mobile games, Candy Crush Saga. The second factor came from the claimed "death knell" for Adobe Flash via way of Steve Jobs' open letter to Adobe in 2010, stating that Apple would not support Flash on the iPhone platform due to security concerns and other factors. About a year after Jobs' letter, Adobe announced it would start deprecating Flash and transition users to HTML5 and other open standards in its other products. Adobe completely shut down Flash by December 30, 2020 after giving web developers a few years to prepare for this event. With little future in Flash, developers moved away from the browser platform in the early 2010s.

However, the latter part of the 2000s in terms of browser games also overlapped with the emergence of indie games. In the late 1990s and early 2000s, the video game industry had started to coalesce around triple-A development, games made by large studios with multi-million dollar budgets. Because of the money involved, the industry took few risks in these major titles, and experimental games were generally overlooked.  Browser games gave a venue for such titles during the early 2000s, and the broader interest in-browser games by the mid-2000s highlighted several of these titles. Subsequently, a number of early indie games are those based on browser games, such as The Behemoth's Castle Crashers, inspired by Newgrounds' Alien Hominid and Edmund McMillen's Super Meat Boy based on his Meat Boy browser game. Other indie developers got their start in browser and Flash games, including Vlambeer, Bennett Foddy, and Maddy Thorson.

Post-2010, browser games written in other formats besides Flash remain popular, such as HTML5, WebGL, and WebAssembly. The .io domain, which was first used in 2015 by Agar.io, has become a popular domain attached to browser games, because of its short length, the ease of acquiring the domain, and the association with programming because "io" can also stand for input/output. Subsequently, these game developers have found ways to monetize their work by creating versions for mobile devices or other platforms which they can sell.

Controversies 

Many Flash games in the late 1990s and early 2000s received attention through the use of shock comedy or real-world events, like McDonald's Videogame, a satire of McDonald's' business practices, or Darfur is Dying, about the War in Darfur, Sudan. In 2017, Julie Muncy writing for Wired said, "Flash games lent themselves to the exaggerated and cartoonish, a style that eventually evolved into an affection-at least amongst its best creators-for beautiful grotesquerie. Like much of the younger gaming internet, Flash games defined boundaries simply to cross them; the best titles straddled a weird line between innocence and cruelty, full of gorgeous gore and enthralling body horror". 

Newgrounds founder Tom Fulp created a game called Pico's School based on the Columbine shootings, where the player must take down a goth school shooter. There are a few other controversies involving browser games and real-world events, such as the 2007 Virginia Tech shooting reenactment V-Tech Rampage, and NRA CEO Wayne LaPierre targeting the game Kindergarten Killers after the 2012 Sandy Hook shootings.

See also 

 List of browser games

References 

 
Multiplayer and single-player video games
Persistent worlds
Video game genres
Video game terminology